The 1941 Hyūga-nada earthquake occurred off the coast of Kyushu, Japan at 19:02 local time on November 19. A seismic intensity of 5 was observed in Miyazaki City and Nobeoka City in Miyazaki Prefecture, and Hitoyoshi City in Kumamoto Prefecture. The tsunami washed away many ships. Twenty seven homes were destroyed and two people were killed. In Miyazaki, Ōita and Kagoshima prefectures, telephone services were disrupted. At Nobeoka, stone walls and embankments were damaged while roads cracked. It was felt as far as central Honshu.

See also
List of earthquakes in 1941
List of earthquakes in Japan

References

Hyuga-nada
Hyuga-nada
Tsunamis in Japan
Earthquakes of the Showa period
1941 disasters in Japan